Gino Strezovski (born 2 November 1959) is a Macedonian handball coach for the Macedonian women's national team.

References

1959 births
Living people
Macedonian handball coaches
Place of birth missing (living people)
21st-century Macedonian people